Ama Namin is a 1998 Philippine action drama film directed by Ben Yalung. The film stars Christopher de Leon.

Cast
 Christopher de Leon as Fr. Rico / Ka Marco
 Sunshine Cruz as Ka Celia / Ka Lilia
 Chin Chin Gutierrez as Ka Riza
 Mat Ranillo III as Capt. Victor Santos
 Tonton Gutierrez as Lt. Garcia
 Rez Cortez as Capt. Garcia
 Daniel Fernando as Ka Benjie
 Patrick dela Rosa as Ka Romy
 Pocholo Montes as Ka Elmer
 Maritess Samson as Ka Miguel
 Ray Ventura as Msgr. Reyes
 Robert Ortega as Ka Luis
 Suzette Ranillo as Kadyo's Wife
 Edgar Mande as Kadyo
 Diego Castro as Basil
 Tom Olivar as Provincial Commander
 Robert Rivera as Kapitan Celso
 Troy Martino as Sarhento
 Amado Cortez as Don Jose de Dios
 Marita Zobel as Ester de Dios
 Joanne Salazar as Hilda de Dios
 Vincent Borromeo as Jesus Christ
 Joe Towers as Andoy
 Gina Galang as Ka Belen

Awards

References

External links

1998 films
1998 action films
Filipino-language films
Philippine action films
Premiere Productions films
Cine Suerte films